Trebarber or Trebarver is a hamlet situated off the A3059, just south of RAF St Mawgan in Cornwall, England, United Kingdom.

References

Hamlets in Cornwall